Audrey Sumin Shin (born March 12, 2004) is an American figure skater. She is the 2020 Skate America bronze medalist, the 2021 CS Lombardia Trophy bronze medalist, and finished fourth at the 2022 Four Continents Championships.

She is also the 2019 U.S. junior silver medalist and competed at the 2020 Winter Youth Olympics, placing seventh.

Personal life 
Shin was born on March 12, 2004, in Smithtown, New York, to parents Eric and Nicole Shin. Shin has a younger sister named Sydney, and she is fluent in Korean.

Career

Early career 
Shin started skating in 2010. She first made her appearance at the U.S. Championships in 2014 at the juvenile level, placing 9th. The following season, Shin did not qualify for the 2015 U.S. Championships for the intermediate competition due to a 10th-place finish at Eastern Sectionals. Similarly, after placing 5th at the 2016 Eastern Sectionals at the novice level, Shin did not qualify for the 2016 U.S. Championships.

Shin placed 9th at the novice level at the 2017 U.S. Championships and 9th at the junior level at the 2018 U.S. Championships. She was assigned to her first international competition, the 2017 Asian Open, where she placed 7th at the junior level.

2018–2019 season: Junior national medalist 
Shin started the season at the 2018 JGP Amber Cup, where she placed 7th. In January, Shin competed at the 2019 U.S. Championships at the junior level, where she placed 2nd behind Gabriella Izzo. Shin was then assigned to compete at the 2019 Egna Spring Trophy, where she placed 4th at the junior level. Shin underwent ankle surgery in May 2019 to remove a ganglion cyst and was unable to train for a month following the surgery. After the operation, she had to relearn how to walk.

2019–2020 season: Youth Winter Olympian 
Shin began the season with a silver medal at the 2019 Philadelphia Summer international at the junior level and was assigned to JGP Russia, where she placed 12th.

Shin experienced several issues with her boots and blades that contributed to an unsuccessful start to the season. She failed to qualify for the 2020 U.S. Championships due to a 6th-place finish at the Eastern Sectional Final and coupled with her rough start to the season, considered quitting the sport. Shin was later assigned to compete at the 2020 Winter Youth Olympic Games in Lausanne, Switzerland, where she placed 7th. Shin described the Youth Winter Olympics as a "huge motivating factor" in her career.

2020–2021 season: Senior international debut 
Due to the COVID-19 pandemic, the 2020–21 ISU Junior Grand Prix, where Shin intended to compete, was canceled. She was instead assigned to the modified Grand Prix event, 2020 Skate America. After skating without errors on her jumping passes, Shin won a medal in her senior international debut by finishing in third place behind Mariah Bell and Bradie Tennell. Although her scores were personal bests, the domestic nature of the event meant that they would not count as official ISU records.

Competing at the 2021 U.S. Championships at the senior level for the first time, Shin placed seventh. As a result, she was named third alternate for the 2021 World Championships team.

Shin stated that she was working on both a triple Axel and quadruple toe loop with her coach, Tammy Gambill.

2021–2022 season 
Shin dealt with an injury in the off-season that caused her to scrap plans to attempt to up her technical content for the new season. She began the season at her first Challenger event, the 2021 CS Lombardia Trophy, where she won the bronze medal. She was twelfth of twelve skaters at the 2021 Skate America, and went on to finish fourth at the 2021 CS Cup of Austria. 

Ninth in the short program at the 2022 U.S. Championships, Shin rose to sixth overall with a fifth-place free skate, despite several underrotated jumps. Her placement earned Shin an assignment to the 2022 Four Continents Championships. She was fifth in both segments and placed fourth overall with a new personal best score of 203.86. Speaking after, Shin said that she hoped to resume her efforts to introduce more difficult technical elements.

2022−2023 season 
Due to ongoing ankle problems, Shin initially scaled down her technical content at the start of the season. She began her season with a gold medal at the 2022 Cranberry Cup International. After feedback from judges at the event, she replaced her initial Tosca free skate with a modified version of her prior Michael W. Smith short program. She then went on to finish fourth at the 2022 CS U.S. International Figure Skating Classic. After the free skate there, she said, "it's a two-week-old program. So, it was very rushed trying to get into the choreography. I'm glad I performed decently, and I'm excited to build up from here."

On the Grand Prix circuit, Shin finished fifth at the 2022 Grand Prix de France. At her second event, the 2022 NHK Trophy, Shin finished fourth in the short program, less than three points back of third-place Rion Sumiyoshi. She was fifth in the free skate, but remained fourth overall, 4.12 points behind bronze medalist Sumiyoshi.

Programs

Competitive highlights 
GP: Grand Prix; CS: Challenger Series; JGP: Junior Grand Prix

Detailed results 
Small medals for short and free programs awarded only at ISU Championships.

Senior results

Junior results

References

External links 
 
 Audrey Shin at U.S. Figure Skating

2004 births
Living people
American female single skaters
Sportspeople from Smithtown, New York
American sportspeople of Korean descent
Figure skaters at the 2020 Winter Youth Olympics
21st-century American women
People from Northport, New York